Charles Point is a headland on the north side of the entrance to Brialmont Cove, and forming the southwest extremity of Relyovo Peninsula on the west coast of Graham Land, Antarctica. The present name derives from Cape Charles, first used in about 1831. This name, appearing on early maps in this approximate location, has sometimes been misapplied to the cape at the north side of Hughes Bay.

References
 

Headlands of Graham Land
Danco Coast